Ostrov is a rural locality (a village) in Andreyevskoye Rural Settlement, Vashkinsky District, Vologda Oblast, Russia. The population was 123 as of 2002. There are 2 streets.

Geography 
Ostrov is located 37 km north of Lipin Bor (the district's administrative centre) by road. Malaya Chagotma is the nearest rural locality.

References 

Rural localities in Vashkinsky District